H. Vinoth is an Indian film director and writer who works in the Tamil cinema. He made his directorial debut with Sathuranga Vettai (2014). He went on to direct films, such as Theeran Adhigaaram Ondru (2017), Nerkonda Paarvai (2019), Valimai (2022), and Thunivu (2023).

Film career 
He worked as an assistant director to R. Parthiepan and Vijay Milton, in Pachchak Kuthira and Goli Soda, respectively.

Sathuranga Vettai, his directorial debut,produced by manobala in 2014, was very well received by both the critics and audience, alike. It was said to be a "con film". Vinoth stated that, "my film is about the pace at which we all want to make money in our lives. It is about the anger of the common man, who thinks money is the solution to all his problems. When there is an imbalance in nature, we experience tsunamis and earthquakes. Likewise, my story is about the imbalance in the social morals of a common man". Although it was a heist film, the director said that he had made the film "as funny as possible" and that it had been narrated , was signed on as director. The film subsequently began production in mid-October 2016.

In early 2016, Vinoth narrated a script to Karthi, who was very impressed and agreed to team up with him, after the release of Kaashmora and Kaatru Veliyidai. The film was titled as Theeran Adhigaaram Ondru and produced by S. R. Prakashbabu and S.R. Prabhu, under Dream Warrior Pictures. The story was based on true events from Operation Bawaria, which involved the nefarious activity of dacoits and its eventual containment by Tamil Nadu police. Karthi and Rakul Preet Singh played the lead roles in the film, while Abhimanyu Singh played the prime antagonist. Upon release, it received highly positive reviews. Karthi's performance was highly acclaimed, for which, he received the Filmfare Critics Award for Best Actor – South and was nominated for the Filmfare Award for Best Actor – Tamil. 

During the post-production of Theeran Adhigaaram Ondru, Vinoth narrated a story of a con-man, to Ajith. However, Ajith rejected it, citing he had done similar movies, and suggested him to remake Pink, in Tamil. Ajith mentioned that he liked his style of writing and wanted him as the director, particularly. Initially, Vinoth was reluctant on doing a remake, but on Ajith's request and repeated viewings of the original, he accepted to do it under Boney Kapoor's production house, Bayview Projects. Boney Kapoor, Ajith, and Vinoth entered into a two film deal, that started with Nerkonda Paarvai, and a big-budget action thriller, Valimai. Nerkonda Paarvai released on 8 August 2019 and received positive reviews from critics. Valimai released on 25 February 2022, to mixed reviewes and was a box office success. In 2023, his next directional film Thunivu was released, it was also a box office success with gross of over 200 crores.  Now, Vinoth is working on the script of Valimai 2, which is a sequel to his blockbuster movie Valimai, Thunivu 2 and Thunivu 3. The latter two are sequels to his film Thunivu. All are produced by Boney Kapoor and star Ajith Kumar.

Filmography 

Living people
Tamil film directors
Film directors from Tamil Nadu
People from Vellore district
1981 births

References